Gardenia fucata is a species of plant in the family Rubiaceae native to northern Australia.

References

fucata
Plants described in 1867